Jon Winokur (born August 5, 1947) is an American writer and editor.

Born in Detroit, the son of Martin M. and Elinor Winokur, he attended Temple University (BA, 1970) and the University of West Los Angeles (JD, 1980).

Books 
MasterTips (Potshot Press, 1985).
Writers on Writing (Running Press, 1986)
The Portable Curmudgeon (NAL, 1987)
Zen to Go (NAL, 1988)
A Curmudgeon’s Garden of Love (NAL, 1989)
Friendly Advice (Dutton, 1990)
Mondo Canine (Dutton, 1991)
True Confessions (Dutton, 1992)
The Portable Curmudgeon Redux (Dutton, 1992)
Fathers (Dutton, 1993)
Je Ne Sais What? (Dutton, 1995)
Return Of The Portable Curmudgeon (Penguin, 1995)
The Rich Are Different (Pantheon, 1996)
Happy Motoring (with Norrie Epstein; Abbeville, 1997)
Advice to Writers (Pantheon, 1999)
How to Win at Golf Without Actually Playing Well (Pantheon, 2000)
The Traveling Curmudgeon (Sasquatch, 2003)
The War Between the State (Sasquatch, 2004)
Encyclopedia Neurotica (St. Martin’s, 2005)
In Passing (Sasquatch, 2005)
Ennui to Go (Sasquatch, 2005)
The Big Curmudgeon (Black Dog & Leventhal, 2007)
The Big Book of Irony (St. Martin’s, 2007)
The Garner Files: A Memoir (with James Garner; Simon & Schuster, 2011)
But Enough About Me: A Memoir (with Burt Reynolds; Putnam, 2015)

References

Sources 

"L.A.'s Viceroy of Vitriol: Profile of Jon Winokur," by Garry Abrams, Los Angeles Times, January 15, 1990.

External links 
"Jon Winokur on Twitter"
“With Dodgers Announcer Vin Scully, It's Always More Than Pleasant Good”
"Ten Questions with Jon Winokur: How to Heighten Your Sense of the Absurd"
"You Call That Irony?"
"Advice To Writers: The Best Books On Writing Books"
"Interview with Jon Winokur by Scott Holleran"
AdviceToWriters.com"

1947 births
Jewish American writers
Jewish comedy and humor
Living people
Writers from Detroit
American humorists
21st-century American Jews